Gerled is an unincorporated community in Kossuth County, in the U.S. state of Iowa.

History
Gerled was named by conjoining the names of two adjacent townships: German and Ledyard. A post office was established at Gerled in 1902, and remained in operation until it was discontinued in 1951.

Gerled's population was 27 in 1925.

References

Unincorporated communities in Kossuth County, Iowa
1902 establishments in Iowa
Populated places established in 1902
Unincorporated communities in Iowa